The Ministry of Emergency Situations of Kyrgyzstan is a special ministry in Kyrgyzstan dedicated to the response of natural disasters such as earthquakes or landslides or serious accidents. The current emergencies minister is Boobek Ajikeev.

History 
On July 1, 1991 the Council of Ministers of the Kyrgyz SSR established the State Commission for Emergency Situations of the Kyrgyz Republic based on the resolution of the establishment of a state all-union system for preventing emergency situations and emergency response by the Council of Ministers of the USSR. On January 6, 1992 the State Commission for Emergency Situations of the Kyrgyz Republic was reorganized into the modern Ministry of Emergency Situations of Kyrgyzstan. Between 1999 and 2005, during the process of Police reform in the Ministry of Internal Affairs, the State Fire Service was transferred to the command of the Emergency Situations Ministry. On October 6, 2008 the ministry was called upon to take action after the 2008 Kyrgyzstan earthquake.

Management 
 Executive leadership
 President – Commander-in-Chief of the Armed Forces of the Kyrgyz Republic
 Prime Minister – Head of the Civil Defense
 Governors – Heads of Oblast Civil Protection
 Mayors – Heads of Civil Protection Systems (CPS)
 Ministry leadership
 Minister of Emergency Situations – Deputy Chairman of the Civil Protection Interdepartmental Commission
 State Secretary
 Deputy Minister
 Deputy Minister
 Deputy Minister
 Adviser to the Minister of Emergency Situations

Structure 
The ministry has the following structure:

 Regional departments
Bishkek City Department
Osh City Department
 Department for Osh Region
 Department for Jalal-Abad Region
 Department for Batken Region
 Department for Chüy Region
 Department for Naryn Region
 Department for Monitoring and Forecasting
 Department for the Elimination of Consequences
 Regional Department of the Elimination of Consequences
 Selvodzashita (state enterprise)
 Spaspromservice (state enterprise)
 Aviation Enterprise
 Emergency Response Centers (Northern and Southern)
 Mechanized Center for Emergency Response
 Diving Service
 Center for Rescuers Training
 Firefighting Service
 Agency for Tailings
 Hydrometerlogical Agency
 Population Training Center
 Center for Preparation and Retaining of Civil Defense Specialists

Cooperation 
Since 2011, the Ministry of Emergency Situations has been cooperating with the International Civil Defence Organization (ICDO). In April 2015, Minister Boronov was elected as a Vice-President of the ICDO. In August 2018, the ministry received 22 new vehicles from the Japanese government, allowing the rescue services to render assistance at a high level on time.

List of ministers 

 Kamchybek Tashiev (2007–15 December 2009)
 Bakyt Torobayev (15 December 2009 – 2010)
 Kubatbek Boronov (24 December 2011 – 20 April 2018)
 Nurbolot Mirzahmedov (20 April 2018 – 23 January 2020)
 Zamirbek Askarov (6 February-15 October 2020)
 Boobek Ajikeev (since 14 October 2020)

See also 
 Government of Kyrgyzstan
 Ministry of Emergency Situations (disambiguation)

References 

Organisations based in Kyrgyzstan
Government ministries of Kyrgyzstan
Government of Kyrgyzstan
Civil defense
Ministries established in 1991
Humanitarian military operations